María Pia Ayora (born 1 June 1962) is a Peruvian breaststroke, freestyle and medley swimmer. She competed in three events at the 1980 Summer Olympics.

References

External links
 

1962 births
Living people
Peruvian female breaststroke swimmers
Peruvian female freestyle swimmers
Peruvian female medley swimmers
Olympic swimmers of Peru
Swimmers at the 1980 Summer Olympics
Place of birth missing (living people)
20th-century Peruvian women